Boris Becker was the defending champion and won in the final 7–5, 6–4, 2–6, 6–4 against Emilio Sánchez.

Seeds
The top eight seeds received a bye into the second round.

  Stefan Edberg (third round)
  Miloslav Mečíř (quarterfinals)
  Boris Becker (champion)
  Pat Cash (semifinals)
  Tim Mayotte (second round)
  Martín Jaite (second round)
  Andre Agassi (semifinals)
  Emilio Sánchez (final)
  David Pate (third round)
  Eliot Teltscher (second round)
  Amos Mansdorf (quarterfinals)
  Eduardo Bengoechea (third round)
  Christo van Rensburg (second round)
  Peter Lundgren (first round)
  Mikael Pernfors (quarterfinals)
  Jimmy Arias (first round)

Draw

Finals

Top half

Section 1

Section 2

Bottom half

Section 3

Section 4

References
 1988 Newsweek Champions Cup Draw - Men's Singles

Newsweek Champions Cup - Singles